An asylum seeker is a person who leaves their country of residence, enters another country and applies for asylum (i.e., international protection) in that other country. An asylum seeker is an immigrant who has been forcibly displaced and might have fled their home country because of war or other factors harming them or their family. If their case is accepted, they become considered a refugee. The terms asylum seeker, refugee and illegal immigrant are often confused.

A person becomes an asylum seeker by making a formal application for the right to remain in another country and keeps that status until the application has been concluded. The relevant immigration authorities of the country of asylum determine whether the asylum seeker will be granted protection and become an officially recognized refugee or whether asylum will be refused and the asylum seeker becomes an illegal immigrant who may be asked to leave the country and may even be deported.

In North American English, the term asylee is also used. An asylee can either be an asylum seeker, as defined above, or a person whose claim for asylum was accepted and asylum was granted. On average, about 1 million people apply for asylum every year.

The asylum seeker may be recognised as a refugee and given refugee status if their circumstances fall into the definition of refugee according to the 1951 Refugee Convention or other refugee laws—such as the European Convention on Human Rights, if asylum is claimed within the European Union. However, signatories to the refugee convention create their own policies for assessing the protection status of asylum seekers, and the proportion of asylum applicants who are accepted or rejected varies each year from country to country.

Types of asylum and protection
Asylum as an institution is not restricted to the category of individuals who qualify for refugee status. On the contrary, this institution predates the birth of the international regime for the protection of refugees.

Asylum seekers who have committed crimes against peace, a war crime or a crime against humanity, or other serious non-political crimes, or whose actions are contrary to the purposes and principles of the United Nations, are excluded from international protection.

Convention refugee status
The 1951 Convention, in Article 1, endorses a single definition of the term "refugee". Its emphasis is on protection from political or other forms of persecution. The Convention defines a refugee as: someone who is unable or unwilling to return to their country of origin owing to a well-founded fear of being persecuted for reasons of race, religion, nationality, membership of a particular social group, or political opinion.

As of 1 July 2013, there were 145 parties to the 1951 Refugee Convention and 146 to the 1967 Protocol. These states are bound by an obligation under international law to grant asylum to people who fall within the definition of Convention and Protocol. The refugee definitions of 1951 and 1967 are the strictest and most exclusive and persons who fall within this definition are called Convention refugees and their status is called Convention refugee status. Persons who do not fall within this definition may still be granted complementary forms of protection, if they fall within other refugee definitions.

The practical determination of whether a person is a refugee or not is most often left to certain government agencies within the host country. In some countries the refugee status determination (RSD) is done by the UNHCR. The burden of substantiating an asylum claim lies with the claimant, who must establish that they qualify for protection.

In many countries, country-of-origin information is used by migration officials as part of the assessment of asylum claims, and governments commission research into the accuracy of their country reports. Some countries have studied the rejection rates of their migration officials making decisions, finding that individuals reject more applicants than others assessing similar cases—and migration officials are required to standardise the reasons for accepting or rejecting claims, so that the decision of one adjudicator is consistent with what their colleagues decide.

The refugee definition of the 1951 Convention is universally binding, but there are many other definitions according to which protection may be offered to people who do not fall within this definition.

Subsidiary protection status
Subsidiary protection is an international protection for persons seeking asylum who do not qualify as refugees. It is an option to get asylum for those who do not have a well-founded fear of persecution (which is required for refugee status according to the 1951 Convention), but do indeed have a substantial risk to be subjected to torture or to a serious harm if they are returned to their country of origin, for reasons that include war, violence, conflict and massive violations of human rights. The Universal Declaration of Human Rights and European Union law have a broader definition of who is entitled to asylum.

Temporary protection visa
Temporary protection visas are used to persons in Australia who applied for refugee status after making an unauthorised arrival. It is the main type of visa issued to refugees when released from Australian immigration detention facilities and they are required to reapply for it every three years.

Statistics of asylum decisions

Status determination processes

Group determination
Asylum seekers may be given refugee status on a group basis. Refugees who went through the group status determination are also referred to as prima facie refugees. This is done in situations when the reasons for seeking refugee status are generally well known and individual assessment would otherwise overwhelm the capacities of assessors. Group determination is more readily done in states that not only have accepted the refugee definition of the 1951 Convention, but also use a refugee definition that includes people fleeing indiscriminate or generalized violence, which are not covered in the 1951 Convention.

Individual assessment
For persons who do not come into the country as part of a bigger group, individual asylum interviews are conducted to establish whether the person has sufficient reasons for seeking asylum. Meanwhile, high numbers of asylum seekers necessitate governments to provide machine learning systems to assist both asylum seekers and immigration officers in performing fair and just assessments.

Appeals
In many countries, asylum applicants can challenge a rejection by challenging the decision in a court or migration review panel. In the United Kingdom, more than one in four decisions to refuse an asylum seeker protection are overturned by immigration judges.

Rights of asylum seekers

Whilst waiting for a decision asylum seekers have limited rights in the country of asylum. In most countries they are not allowed to work and in some countries not even to volunteer. In some countries they are not allowed to move freely within the country. Even access to health care is limited. In the European Union, those who have yet to be granted official status as refugees and are still within the asylum process have some restricted rights to healthcare access. This includes access to medical and psychological care. However, these may vary depending on the host country.  For instance, under the Asylum Seekers Benefits Act (Asylbewerberleistungsgesetz) in Germany, asylum seekers are outside primary care and are limited to emergency health care, vaccinations, pregnancy and childbirth with limitations on specialty care.  Asylum seekers have greater chance of experiencing unmet health needs as compared to the general German population. Asylum seekers also have greater odds of hospital admissions and at least one visit to a psychotherapists relative to the German general population.

Concerns in asylum-seeking processes 

Research suggests cross-sector collaboration is key to assist refugees and asylum seekers resettle and integrate into receiving communities, workplaces and schools.

Non-governmental organizations concerned with refugees and asylum seekers have pointed out difficulties for displaced persons to seek asylum in industrialized countries. As the immigration policy in many countries often focuses on the fight of illegal immigration and the strengthening of border controls, it deters displaced persons from entering territory in which they could lodge an asylum claim. The lack of opportunities to legally access the asylum procedures can force displaced persons to undertake often expensive and hazardous attempts at illegal entry.

In recent years, the public as well as policy makers of many countries are focusing more and more on refugees arriving through third country resettlement and pay less and less attention to asylum seekers and those who have already been granted refugee status but did not come through resettlement. Asylum seekers have even been referred to as 'queue jumpers', because they did not wait for their chance to be resettled.

Legal interpreters are assigned to assist asylum seekers throughout interviews and court proceedings. These legal interpreters reflect the training they received in the training program they were certified in. The accuracy of the legal interpretation may vary depending on the training received from the interpreter and potential biases they carry coming into the interpreting session. Lack of training in asylum settings may influence interpretation sessions.

Quality of life of asylum seekers and refugees is highly correlated with the mental health status. The presence of mental disorders like depression or PTSD is mainly due to the forced migration and the resettlement in host countries.

Destitution
Because asylum seekers often have to wait for months or years for the results of their asylum applications and because they are usually not allowed to work and only receive minimal or no financial support, destitution is a considerable risk.

Asylum seekers usually get some kind of support from governments whilst their application is processed. However, in some countries this support ends immediately once they are given refugee status. But the fact that they were given refugee status does not mean that they were already given all the documents they need for starting their new lives.
Long waiting times significantly reduce the likelihood to obtain a job and the social integration of refugees.

Refusal of asylum

It often happens that the country neither recognizes the refugee status of the asylum seekers nor sees them as legitimate migrants and thus treats them as illegal aliens. If an asylum claim has been rejected, the asylum seeker is said to be refused asylum, and called a failed asylum seeker. Some failed asylum seekers are allowed to remain temporarily, some return home voluntarily and some are forcibly returned. The latter are most often placed in immigration detention before being deported.

In some cases in which asylum is not granted, the applicant is given the right to remain temporarily. In the UK, refused cases may be granted humanitarian protection (usually for five years) or discretionary leave to remain.

Asylum and refugee law by jurisdiction

See also
 Right of asylum
 Church asylum
 Impediment to expulsion
 Internally displaced person
 Forced displacement in popular culture
 Refugee employment
 Refugee identity certificate
 Refugee roulette
 Sanctuary city
 Statelessness
 Transgender asylum seekers

Related organizations 
 Organization for Refugees Asylum and Migration
 Amnesty International
 International Committee of the Red Cross
 International Cities of Refuge Network
 United Nations High Commissioner for Refugees

References

Notes

Further reading 
 Hatton, Timothy J. 2020. "Asylum Migration to the Developed World: Persecution, Incentives, and Policy. " Journal of Economic Perspectives 34(1):75-93.

International law
Human rights
Refugees
Forced migration